William Joseph Stapleton (born July 12, 1965) is an American former competition swimmer who represented the United States at the 1988 Summer Olympics in Seoul, South Korea.  He competed in the B Final of the men's 200-meter individual medley event, and finished with the sixteenth-best time overall.

Stapleton was cyclist Lance Armstrong's agent for nearly 20 years, including the time of Armstrong's doping scandal.  Stapleton was portrayed by American  actor Lee Pace in the 2015 film The Program.

See also
 List of University of Texas at Austin alumni

References

1965 births
Living people
American male butterfly swimmers
American male medley swimmers
Olympic swimmers of the United States
Swimmers at the 1987 Pan American Games
Swimmers at the 1988 Summer Olympics
Texas Longhorns men's swimmers
Place of birth missing (living people)
Pan American Games gold medalists for the United States
Pan American Games medalists in swimming
Medalists at the 1987 Pan American Games
20th-century American people
21st-century American people